The Overseas Museum in Bremen is a Natural History and ethnographic museum in northern Germany. In an integrated exhibition of Nature, Culture and Trading, the museum presents aspects of overseas regions with permanent exhibitions relating to Asia, South Pacific/Oceania, Americas and Africa. The building is protected by the monument protection act.

History
In 1875, the collections of the Bremen Natural History Society became the property of the city of Bremen.

Directors 
 1887 to 1933 Hugo Schauinsland, zoologist
 1933 to 1945 Carl Friedrich Roewer (1881–1963), zoologist
 1950 to 1962 Helmuth O. Wagner (1897–1977), ornithologist
 1962 to 1971 Hermann Friedrich (1906–1997), biologist
 1971 to 1975 Herbert Abel (1911–1994),
 1975 to 1992 Herbert Ganslmayr (1937–1991), ethnologist
 1992 to 2001 Viola König (born 1952) 
 from 2002 Wiebke Ahrndt (born 1963)

References

von Briskorn, Bettina 2000 Zur Sammlungsgeschichte afrikanischer Ethnographica im Übersee-Museum Bremen, 1841-1945 Bremen : Übersee-Museum Bremen, 2000. 

 Official Website
 Peter René Becker: Bedeutende Sammlung von Exoten. Überseemuseum Bremen (PDF-Datei; 631 kB)
 Überseemuseum Stadt-Panorama

Natural history museums in Germany
Ethnographic museums in Germany
Museums in Bremen (city)
Museums established in 1875
1875 establishments in Germany